Sarasota Bank was an independent Sarasota, Florida-based bank operated by Sarasota BanCorporation. It was sold to Colonial BancGroup in a stock swap worth $40.5 million. It was established September 15, 1992, and went inactive December 4, 2003, when it was subsumed into Colonial Bank.

References 

Banks based in Florida
Defunct banks of the United States
Banks established in 1992
1992 establishments in Florida
Banks disestablished in 2003
2003 disestablishments in Florida